Mallory Alyse Weber (born April 4, 1994) is an American soccer player who plays as a forward for Kansas City Current of the National Women's Soccer League (NWSL).

Club career

Portland Thorns FC, 2016–2019
Weber was drafted by Western New York Flash in the 2nd round of the 2016 NWSL College Draft. In March 2016, she was traded to Portland Thorns FC. Weber appeared in 13 games for Portland in 2016.

She returned to the Thorns for the 2017 NWSL season where she made a career high 17 appearances and scored 1 goal as the Thorns won the 2017 NWSL Championship. Weber re-signed with Portland ahead of the 2018 NWSL season. She made 14 appearances for the Thorns in 2018.

Weber appeared in one match for the Thorns in 2019 before she was waived by the team on May 8.

Utah Royals FC, 2019–2020
On May 13, 2019, Utah Royals FC acquired Weber off the NWSL waiver wire. She made her debut for the Royals on May 19 against the North Carolina Courage.

Honors

Club
Portland Thorns FC
NWSL Champions: 2017
NWSL Shield: 2016

References

External links
Penn State bio
Portland Thorns bio
 

1994 births
Living people
American women's soccer players
National Women's Soccer League players
Penn State Nittany Lions women's soccer players
People from Novi, Michigan
Portland Thorns FC players
Soccer players from Michigan
United States women's under-20 international soccer players
Western New York Flash draft picks
Women's association football forwards
Utah Royals FC players
Kansas City Current players